U.S. Route 501 (US 501) is a spur of U.S. Route 1. It runs 355 miles (571 km) from Buena Vista, Virginia at U.S. Route 60 to Myrtle Beach, South Carolina at U.S. Route 17 Business.
It passes through the states of Virginia, North Carolina and South Carolina. From Durham to Laurinburg, a  section of US 501 overlaps U.S. Route 15.
Sections of US 15-501 also share routings with U.S. Route 1 in sections near Sanford, North Carolina and Aberdeen, North Carolina.



Route description

|-
|SC
|
|-
|NC
|
|-
|VA
|
|-
|Total
|
|}

South Carolina
US 501 in South Carolina is a north–south United States highway that traverses ; it is one of main routes to the Grand Strand. US501 begins at US 17 Bus. in Myrtle Beach, South Carolina. From Myrtle Beach to Marion, US 501 is a multilane highway, some sections divided, some undivided, mostly with at-grade intersections but having a number of interchanges along the length. The first of these interchanges is with US 17, which is a cloverleaf interchanges that includes railroad crossings at the ramps along the east side. After the bridge over the Intracoastal Waterway it has two more interchanges with local roads. Next there is an unusual hybrid interchange with South Carolina Highway 31, similar to a cloverstack, with elements of a trumpet interchange, in which two flyover ramps from SC 31 to US 501 exit left from SC 31 and wrap around the interchange's loop ramps. After this interchange, this limited-access portion comes to an end. US501 passes through the city of Conway where it has a short overlap with U.S. Route 701. South of Aynor it serves as the western terminus of SC 22, which has another unconventional interchange, and various interchanges can also be found along the road before reaching Marion, where US 501 bypasses the town to the east. North of Marion, US 501 meets SC 38, a connector to Interstate 95. From SC 38, US 501 heads to the northeast, meeting US 301 in Latta. US 301 merges with US 501, forming a concurrency through Dillon to the North Carolina border, where it passes South of the Border prior to simultaneously exiting South Carolina and interchanging with Interstate 95 near Hamer in Dillon County.

North Carolina

US 501 is a north–south United States highway that traverses the majority of North Carolina in concurrency with US 15, known as "15-501" ("Fifteen Five-o-one"). It enters North Carolina at the South Carolina state line with an intersection of Interstate 95 (I-95) while overlapping US 301, near South of the Border. It goes northwest through Rowland where the overlap with US 301 terminates, and then travels through Raemon to Laurinburg.  Once at Laurinburg, it overlaps briefly with I-74/US 74 before connecting with US 15.  The majority of the route, to this point, is a two-lane rural road.

After Laurinburg it goes north to Aberdeen, linking briefly with US 1 before continuing to Pinehurst. In Pinehurst, 15-501 goes through a roundabout then continues north through Carthage, then back to US 1. After traveling through Sanford on another brief concurrency with US 1, it exits off the freeway and goes due north to Pittsboro. After Pittsboro, 15-501 goes through Chapel Hill and then into Durham. NCDOT has been trying to remedy traffic problems by making the route a superstreet for better traffic flow. In Durham, 15-501 upgrades to an urban freeway, allowing for quick access to Interstate 85, and from south Durham to north; the freeway ends merging into I-85. At exit 176B on I-85, US 501 splits off towards Roxboro, while US 15 continues with I-85 towards Oxford.

After Durham, US 501 goes north to Roxboro, then into South Boston, Virginia after crossing the state line; the majority of this section is a four-lane expressway.

Virginia

North Carolina to Lynchburg

US 501 enters Halifax County, Virginia south of Cluster Springs.  The U.S. Highway is a two-lane road at the North Carolina state line but immediately expands to a four-lane divided highway named Huell Matthews Highway.  US 501 parallels the Mayo River north to the hamlet of Mayo, where the highway meets the western end of SR 96 (Virgilina Road) and crosses the Hyco River.  The U.S. Highway passes through Cluster Springs to the community of Riverdale just south of South Boston.  US 501 becomes an undivided highway and intersects US 58 and US 360, which together head west as Philpott Road and east as Bill Tuck Highway.  US 501 crosses the Dan River into the town of South Boston.  Just north of the river, the highway has a grade crossing of Norfolk Southern Railway's Clover Spur, which follows the former Danville–Richmond rail line, and splits into a one-way pair: Broad Street northbound and Main Street southbound.  Both directions intersect SR 304 (Seymour Drive).  When Main Street veers northeast as two-way SR 129, southbound US 501 continues on two-way Wilborn Avenue to the northern end of the one-way pair.

US 501 continues through South Boston on Wilborn Avenue, a five-lane road with center turn lane.  The U.S. Highway becomes four-lane divided Halifax Road at Hamilton Boulevard.  US 501 receives the northern end of SR 129 (Old Halifax Road) shortly before leaving the town of South Boston.  The U.S. Highway enters the town of Halifax and becomes Main Street, a three-lane road with center turn lane, at its grade crossing of Norfolk Southern's Durham District.  US 501 continues to the county courthouse, where the highway intersects the very short SR 349 (Edmunds Boulevard) and SR 360 (Mountain Road), which runs concurrently with the U.S. Highway through the northern part of the town.  The two highways diverge: SR 360 heads northeast as Bethel Road and US 501 heads northwest as two-lane L.P. Bailey Memorial Highway. which crosses Banister Lake, an impoundment of the Banister River, as it leaves the town of Halifax.

US 501 passes through Volens and Acorn on its way to the hamlet of North Halifax, where the highway begins to run concurrently with SR 40 (Stage Coach Road).  The highways cross the Roanoke River into the town of Brookneal in Campbell County and pass under Norfolk Southern's Altavista District rail line.  The highways continue as Lusardi Drive to Lynchburg Avenue in the center of town; SR 40 turns southeast while US 501 turns north west onto the street just north of the highways' grade crossing of the Durham District rail line.  US 501 leaves the town as Brookneal Highway, which parallels the rail line through the communities of Naruna and Gladys on its way to Rustburg, the county seat of Campbell County.  The U.S. Highway intersects SR 24 (Colonial Highway) at the southern edge of the village.  The highways have a short concurrency before SR 24 continues east as Village Highway and US 501 heads northwest as Campbell Highway.  North of Rustburg, US 501 expands to a four-lane divided highway into the independent city of Lynchburg, where the highway meets US 29 and US 460 (Richmond Highway) at a partial cloverleaf interchange.  US 501 Business and US 460 Business head straight on Campbell Avenue while US 501 joins the freeway heading southwest.

Lynchburg to Buena Vista

US 501 runs concurrently with US 29 and US 460 southwest along the northern slope of Candlers Mountain to a full Y interchange where US 501 heads northwest from the freeway.  The U.S. Highway has an intersection with SR 128 (Mayflower Drive) and Candlers Mountain Road just east of the highway's crossing of Norfolk Southern's Danville District.  SR 128 joins US 501 on Candlers Mountain Road between the intersection and the highway's cloverleaf interchange with US 29 Business (Lynchburg Expressway).  US 501 exits onto the expressway while SR 128 continues west to its terminus.  US 501 and US 29 Business head southwest along the freeway until the business route exits onto Wards Road to head toward Danville.  US 501 curves northwest and has a cloverleaf interchange with US 460 Business (Timberlake Road), crosses Norfolk Southern's Blue Ridge District, and has a diamond interchange with Graves Mill Road.  The freeway ends at US 221 (Lakeside Drive).  US 501 heads north along Old Forest Road as a five-lane road with center turn lane before turning onto a two-lane segment of the Lynchburg Expressway.  This segment has a partial cloverleaf interchange with Wiggington Road before ending at US 501 Business (Boonsboro Road).

US 501 heads northwest on two-lane Boonsboro Road, which becomes Lee Jackson Highway when it exits the city of Lynchburg into Bedford County.  The U.S. Highway curvaceously crosses Fleming Mountain and descends into the James River Gorge at Coleman Falls.  US 501 follows the south bank of the river through Big Island, where the highway meets the northern end of SR 122 (Big Island Highway) and has an interchange with the Blue Ridge Parkway.  North of Big Island, the U.S. Highway crosses the river and immediately intersects SR 130 (Elon Road) on the Amherst County side.  The two highways have a curvaceous crossing of the spine of the Blue Ridge Mountains before descending to the town of Glasgow at the mouth of the Maury River.  The two routes follow the river upstream a short distance before SR 130 (Wert Faulkner Highway) crosses the river into the town.  US 501, now named Glasgow Highway, parallels the river and Norfolk Southern's Roanoke District rail line north to the city of Buena Vista, which the highway enters as Magnolia Avenue.  South of the downtown area, US 501 veers onto Sycamore Street while US 501 Business continues along Magnolia Avenue.  At 22nd Street, the U.S. Highway veers onto Beech Avenue, which receives the northern end of US 501 Business (Park Avenue) west of Southern Virginia University.  Two blocks to the north, US 501 reaches its northern terminus at US 60 (29th Street).

Special routes

History

South Carolina
Established in 1935 as an extension from North Carolina.  US 501 replaced part of US 117 between Myrtle Beach to Socastee, then from there through Conway, Marion, and Latta on what was SC 38.  North of Latta, it overlapped with US 301, through Dillon, and into North Carolina.

During the 1940s, because of the need for a more direct route to Myrtle Beach Air Force Base from Conway, 2-lane US 501 was built through the Buist Tract owned by Southern Kraft Company (later part of International Paper), replacing SC 503, its old alignment was renumbered to SC 544.  In 1950, US 501 was moved onto new construction between Conway and Aynor, its old alignment renumbered to SC 319.  By 1964, US 501 was moved to its current southern bypass from downtown Conway, creating US 501 Bus.  By 1990, US 501 was moved to its current eastern bypass from downtown Marion, creating another US 501 Bus. 

In 2021, the South Carolina Department of Transportation and Horry County announced plans to spend tens of millions of dollars expanding U.S. 501 into four lanes each way near Myrtle Beach.

North Carolina
When US 501 was established in 1927, it was aligned along North Carolina Highway 13 (NC 13) from Durham north through Roxboro to the Virginia state line.

In 1934, it was overlapped with US 15 from Durham south to Laurinburg. From there, it went southeast to Rowland and then to the South Carolina border.  This extension south replaced NC 22, NC 71, and NC 241.

In 1953, US 501 was bypassed around Chapel Hill.  In 1956 or 1957, US 501 was bypassed west of Sanford.  Between 1960-1962, US 501 was bypassed around Laurinburg.

North Carolina Highway 13 (1921-1930)

North Carolina Highway 13 was an original state highway running from Durham, north through Rougemont and Roxboro ending at SR 18 at the Virginia State Line. The highway's routing appeared on the 1916 Highway Map by the North Carolina State Highway Commission for the five year federal aid program. However NC 13 was not officially marked on any state highway maps until 1924; where it was routed from NC 10/NC 75 in Durham north through Rougemont and Timberlake to NC 57 east of Roxboro. NC 13 turned toward the west into Roxboro, before intersecting NC 144 and turning north. The highway had its northern terminus at the Virginia State Line near South Boston. By 1926 the routing of NC 13 was shifted slightly to the west between Timberlake and Roxboro, providing a direct link between the cities. The route was deleted in 1930, with US 501/NC 55 taking over the entirety of the routing.

Major intersections

See also

 Special routes of U.S. Route 501

References

External links

 Endpoints of U.S. highway 501
 Mapmikey's South Carolina Highways Page: US 501
Virginia Highways Project: US 501

 
5
01-5
U.S. Highways in South Carolina
U.S. Highways in North Carolina
U.S. Highways in Virginia